Spencer Dewey Adams (June 21, 1898 – November 24, 1970) was a Major League Baseball player.

Career
He played with the Pittsburgh Pirates in 1923, the Washington Senators in 1925, the New York Yankees in 1926 and the St. Louis Browns in 1927.

Adams played the infield and batted and threw right-handed. He was born in Layton, Utah and died in Salt Lake City, Utah.

After his baseball days, he was a maintenance worker for the Utah State Highway Department.

External links

Pittsburgh Pirates players
New York Yankees players
Washington Senators (1901–1960) players
1898 births
1970 deaths
Major League Baseball infielders
Baseball players from Utah
Milwaukee Brewers (minor league) players
Mobile Marines players
Knoxville Smokies players
Nashville Vols players
Oakland Oaks (baseball) players
Seattle Indians players